Malcolm Eugene Hammack (June 19, 1933 – July 19, 2004) was an American college and professional football player who was a running back in the National Football League (NFL) for twelve years during the 1950s and 1960s.  Hammack played college football for the University of Florida, and thereafter, he played professionally for the Chicago/St. Louis Cardinals of the NFL.

Early life 

Hammack was born in Roscoe, Texas in 1933.  He attended Roscoe High School, where he played for the Roscoe Plowboys high school football team.  After graduating from high school, he attended Arlington State Junior College in Arlington, Texas, and played football for the Arlington State Rebels.

Major college career 

Hammack accepted an athletic scholarship to transfer to the University of Florida in Gainesville, Florida, where he played for coach Bob Woodruff's Florida Gators football team in 1953 and 1954.  As a senior in 1954, he was a second-team All-Southeastern Conference (SEC) selection and the first recipient of the Gators' Fergie Ferguson Award, recognizing the "senior football player who displays outstanding leadership, character and courage."  Woodruff later ranked him as one of the Gators' five best offensive backs of the 1950s.

Hammack returned to Florida to finish his bachelor's degree in 1958, and was later inducted into the University of Florida Athletic Hall of Fame as a "Gator Great."

Professional career 

The Chicago Cardinals selected Hammack in the third round (26th pick overall) in the 1955 NFL Draft, and he played his entire twelve-year professional career for the Cardinals, in both Chicago (–) and St. Louis (–).  Hammack was used primarily as a blocking fullback, but he still had 320 carries for 1,278 yards and seven touchdowns in his career.

See also 

 Florida Gators football, 1950–59
 History of the Arizona Cardinals
 List of Florida Gators in the NFL Draft
 List of University of Florida alumni
 List of University of Florida Athletic Hall of Fame members

References

Bibliography 

 Carlson, Norm, University of Florida Football Vault: The History of the Florida Gators, Whitman Publishing, LLC, Atlanta, Georgia (2007).  .
 Golenbock, Peter, Go Gators!  An Oral History of Florida's Pursuit of Gridiron Glory, Legends Publishing, LLC, St. Petersburg, Florida (2002).  .
 Hairston, Jack, Tales from the Gator Swamp: A Collection of the Greatest Gator Stories Ever Told, Sports Publishing, LLC, Champaign, Illinois (2002).  .
 McCarthy, Kevin M.,  Fightin' Gators: A History of University of Florida Football, Arcadia Publishing, Mount Pleasant, South Carolina (2000).  .
 McEwen, Tom, The Gators: A Story of Florida Football, The Strode Publishers, Huntsville, Alabama (1974).  .
 Nash, Noel, ed., The Gainesville Sun Presents The Greatest Moments in Florida Gators Football, Sports Publishing, Inc., Champaign, Illinois (1998).  .

1933 births
2004 deaths
American football running backs
Chicago Cardinals players
Florida Gators football players
National Football League announcers
People from Roscoe, Texas
St. Louis Cardinals (football) announcers
St. Louis Cardinals (football) players
Texas–Arlington Mavericks football players